El Palmar is the name of several geographical locations:

El Palmar National Park, Argentina
El Palmar, Dominican Republic
El Palmar, Quetzaltenango, Guatemala
El Palmar, Coclé, Panama
El Palmar, Bolívar, Venezuela

Mexico
El Palmar, a community in San Juan Bautista Tuxtepec, Oaxaca
El Palmar, Veracruz, a community in Carrillo Puerto
El Palmar (Maya site), in southeastern Campeche; see Apoch'Waal

Spain
El Palmar, Murcia
El Palmar, Tenerife; see Macizo de Teno
El Palmar, Valencia